Saccharibacillus deserti is a Gram-positive and facultatively anaerobic bacteria from the genus of Saccharibacillus which has been isolated from desert soil from Erdos in China.

References

External links
Type strain of Saccharibacillus deserti at BacDive -  the Bacterial Diversity Metadatabase

Paenibacillaceae
Bacteria described in 2016